Betty Shiver Krawczyk (born August 1928) is a Louisiana-born, British Columbia, Canada based environmental activist, author and former political candidate.

Krawczyk is well known locally for having been arrested and imprisoned numerous times for defying court orders related to logging and highway developments. Most recently, on March 5, 2007,  she was sentenced to 10 months imprisonment for her role in protesting highway construction on the Eagleridge Bluffs in West Vancouver.

In the 2001 Provincial Election, Krawczyk finished third in the riding of Vancouver-Kensington, garnering 9.32% of the popular vote for the Green Party, her highest showing to date.

In the 2008 Canadian federal election she ran unsuccessfully in the Vancouver East riding for the Work Less Party, resulting in 1.02% of the popular vote.

Bibliography
Clayoquot: The Sound Of My Heart (January 1997)
Lock Me up or Let Me Go: The Protests, Arrest and Trial of an Environmental Activist and Grandmother (August 2002)
Open Living Confidential: From Inside the Joint (June 2008)

See also
Raging Grannies
Clayoquot Sound
Harriet Nahanee

References

External links
Betty's Early Edition blog
Schiver Rhodes Publishing - Betty's Book Publishing Company
Records of Betty Krawczyk are held by Simon Fraser University's Special Collections and Rare Books

Writers from British Columbia
1928 births
Living people
People from Louisiana
Canadian women environmentalists
21st-century Canadian criminals
Canadian female criminals
Green Party of British Columbia candidates in British Columbia provincial elections
British Columbia candidates for Member of Parliament
Candidates in the 2008 Canadian federal election
Work Less Party politicians
Articles containing video clips
American emigrants to Canada